The 1971–72 season was the 73rd completed season of The Football League.

Brian Clough, 37, won the first major trophy of his managerial career by guiding Derby County to their first ever league championship. They overcame Leeds United, Liverpool and Manchester City to win a four-horse race, with only a single point separating them. There were later bribery allegations from The Sunday People newspaper regarding Leeds manager Don Revie and Leeds' final opponents Wolverhampton Wanderers. The footballing authorities never investigated these allegations to decide whether they were true or not.

Nottingham Forest and Huddersfield Town lost their First Division status. By the end of the decade, Forest had made an explosive comeback to the top flight. 1971-1972 was Huddersfield's last season in the top flight until their promotion in 2016-17, and within a few seasons they would be in the Fourth Division — most of their existence since 1972 has been spent in the league's lower two divisions.

In the Second Division Norwich City and Birmingham City were promoted. This was the first time that Norwich City had reached the top flight. Charlton Athletic and Watford were relegated.

Aston Villa ended their two-year spell in the Third Division by gaining promotion as champions, and by the end of the decade would be firmly re-established as a First Division club. Brighton & Hove Albion followed Villa into the Second Division, but would not reach the heady heights that the midlanders would experience. Mansfield Town, Barnsley, Torquay United and Bradford City were relegated.

Grimsby Town, Southend United, Brentford and Scunthorpe United were promoted from the Fourth Division. Barrow were voted out of the Football League and replaced by Hereford United, who a short time earlier had achieved a shock FA Cup victory over Newcastle United.

Ernie Tagg sacked himself as manager of Crewe Alexandra because he felt that a younger manager should take charge of the club.

Final league tables and results 

The tables below are reproduced here in the exact form that they can be found at The Rec.Sport.Soccer Statistics Foundation website and in Rothmans Book of Football League Records 1888-89 to 1978-79, with home and away statistics separated.

Beginning with the season 1894–95, clubs finishing level on points were separated according to goal average (goals scored divided by goals conceded), or more properly put, goal ratio. In case one or more teams had the same goal difference, this system favoured those teams who had scored fewer goals. The goal average system was eventually scrapped beginning with the 1976-77 season.

Since the Fourth Division was established in the 1958–59 season, the bottom four teams of that division have been required to apply for re-election.

First Division

Results

Maps

Second Division

Results

Maps

Third Division

Results

Maps

Fourth Division

Results

Maps

See also
 1971–72 in English football

References

Ian Laschke: Rothmans Book of Football League Records 1888–89 to 1978–79. Macdonald and Jane's, London & Sydney, 1980.

External links
 Season 1971-72 complete lineups, tables and squads at Historical Football Lineups

 
English Football League seasons